Kamini Zantoko is a Black French musician and screenwriter.

Personal life
Kamini's father—Seyolo Zantoko—and his family moved from Zaire to Marly-Gomont, France in 1975.  They had difficulty assimilating as the first Black people in town.  Kamini grew up there, and by summer 2006, was working part-time as a nurse.  Seyolo died sometime prior to 2012.

Career
Aspiring to make hip hop music, in 2006 he wrote about Marly-Gomont ("Marly-Gomont"). On 30 August, Kamini uploaded the video and cold-emailed promotions to record companies; instead, a t-shirt retailer shared the link online, and by the end of the day, "Marly-Gomont" was a hit. Off the merits of his amateur viral video, Kamini signed with RCA Records on 2 November to publish "Marly-Gomont" and two more albums.

In 2012, Kamini wrote and narrated the autobiographical film The African Doctor to pay tribute to his father.  It was released in 2016, directed by Julien Rambaldi.

References

External links
 

21st-century French screenwriters
Black composers
French male screenwriters
French people of Republic of the Congo descent
French rappers
living people
male nurses
male rappers
people from Aisne
RCA Records artists
year of birth missing (living people)